The President's National One Day Cup 2013–14 is the twenty ninth edition started in 1985-86 is the premier List A cricket domestic competition in Pakistan, which was held from 28 October 2013 to 1 February 2014.

Venue

Fixtures and Results
All times shown are in Pakistan Standard Time (UTC+05).

Group stage

Points Table Source:Cricinfo

References

National One Day Championship seasons